The Vampires of Bloody Island is a 2009 British comedy horror film directed by Allin Kempthorne and starring Pamela Kempthorne. The film also stars Oliver Gray, John Snelling and Leon Hamilton. The film had a theatrical release in the UK, in August 2009. It was released on DVD in January 2010 several weeks ahead of its planned February release date due to an email campaign organised by fans of the film. It was released on DVD in the US in June 2010.

The Vampires of Bloody Island features music from the bands Inkubus Sukkubus, Vampire Division, Fever, Theatres des Vampires, The Suburban Vamps and Corpse Nocturna. The title song is Place of the Dead by Vampire Division, which reached number one in the Goth Soundclick charts.

Plot

In her castle on an isolated Cornish island, vampire noblewoman Morticia de'Ath and her zombie henchman, Grunt, work with alchemist Dr. N. Sane to discover a cure to grant vampires immunity to sunlight. Caught up in her plans are two bickering office workers Kevin Smallcock and Susan Swallows, and old world vampire hunter Professor Van Rental.

Along the way they encounter werewolves, demons, a seductive trio of vampire girls in nightgowns and the story culminates in a woodland battle with 100 medieval vampire soldiers and their commanding officer, a fey green-skinned battle demon.

Cast

Allin Kempthorne as Kevin Smallcock
Pamela Kempthorne as Morticia de'Ath
Leon Hamiliton as Grunt
John Snelling as Doctor N. Sane

Screenplay
"The Vampires of Bloody Island, The Complete Movie Screenplay" by Allin Kempthorne and Pamela Kempthorne is available as an e-book on the Kindle and on Amazon in the US, UK, France, Spain, Germany and Italy. The first 11 scenes can be read for free.

See also
Vampire film

References

External links
 

2009 films
2000s comedy horror films
2009 horror films
Vampire comedy films
2009 comedy films
2000s English-language films